San Pancrazio is a Roman Catholic basilica in Rome, Italy.

San Pancrazio may also refer to:

Saints
 Pancras of Taormina, 1st-century bishop and martyr
 Pancras of Rome, martyred c. 304 CE

Churches
 San Pancrazio, Florence, Italy
 San Pancrazio, Genoa, Italy
 San Pancrazio, Sestino, Italy

Places
 San Pancrazio, a frazione of Palazzolo sull'Oglio, Italy
 San Pancrazio, a frazione of San Casciano in Val di Pesa, Italy
 San Pancrazio, an island of the Brissago Islands, Switzerland

See also
Church of Saint Pancras (disambiguation)
St Pancras (disambiguation)
St. Pankraz, a town in South Tyrol, Italy